Binius may refer to:

 Severin Binius (15731641), German Roman Catholic priest, historian and critic
 Marguerin de la Bigne, French theologian and patrologist